"Barbados" is a jazz tune composed by Charlie Parker. It is a twelve-bar blues set to a mambo rhythm. Parker first recorded it on September 18, 1948, with Miles Davis (trumpet), John Lewis (piano), Curly Russell (bass) and Max Roach (drums).

Notes 

Compositions by Charlie Parker
1948 compositions
Jazz compositions